Panshak Henry Zamani (born 30 October 1984) better known as Ice Prince Zamani or just Ice Prince, is a Nigerian hip hop recording artist and actor. He rose to fame after releasing "Oleku", one of Nigeria's most remixed songs of all time. He won the 2009 Hennessy Artistry Club Tour. His debut studio album Everybody Loves Ice Prince was released in 2011. It was supported by three singles: "Oleku", "Superstar" and "Juju". In 2013, Ice Prince released Fire of Zamani as his second studio album. The album contained the singles "Aboki", "More", "Gimme Dat" and "I Swear". On 1 July 2015, Ice Prince was announced as the vice president of Chocolate City. He held the position until he left the label in 2016.  He has collaborated with top African rappers like Navio of Uganda, Khaligraph Jones of Kenya, AKA of South Africa, Sarkodie of Ghana among others.

Early life
Ice Prince was born Panshak Henri Zamani  in the city of Minna. At Age two, he moved with his family to the mining city of Jos, Plateau State. He is of Angas ethnicity.

Education 
While residing in Jos, he attended St. Murumba College. He also attended the Science Tutorial Niger State College in Jos.

Career 

In 1999, he began writing rap songs and started performing them at school; in 2001 he began recording them. In 2002, he and some friends formed the "ECOMOG Squad" but split after a year. In 2004, he connected with M.I, Jesse Jagz, Ruby, Lindsey, Eve, Taz, and together they became what is now known today as the "Loopy Crew". He attended the University of Jos to study zoology, but had to stop because of a "financial constraint".

2010–2011: Everybody Loves Ice Prince
During the aforementioned interview, Ice Prince opened up about why he chose to name his debut album, Everybody Loves Ice Prince. He said "What made me give my album that name was when I lost my Mum, really. There was so much love, so much care from all around the world. People really showed me love and it was after that incident that I came back to record my album and I thought what better name to call my album than Everybody Loves Ice Prince because I was shown love".

"Oleku", Ice Prince's first single off his debut album was met with great reception throughout Nigeria. The song was released under Chocolate City. Ice Prince's 'rap resume' has a long list of songs he's been featured on. He was featured on Taikoon's "Respect My Hustle" with Banky W, DJ Neptune's "This Gbedu Reloaded" with YQ & Shank, Bez's "Super Sun (Remix)" with ELDee & Eva Alordiah, YQ's "Efimile (Remix)" with Naeto C, M.I, Banky W, & ELDee, Pherowshuz's "Korrect (remix)" with M.I & Terry Tha Rapman, Dekunle Fuji's "Funmilayo" with Jesse Jagz, Jamix's "My Party" with Wizkid & Kel, Reminisce's "2 Mussh [Remix]" with Sauce Kid, and Knighthouse's "Make it Better" with Mo'Cheddah, Funbi, & Mobie, among others.

2012–2013 :Fire of Zamani
In 2012, he began frequent collaborations with Grip Boiz City producer Chopstix, releasing "Aboki" in the summer of 2012. An accompanying music video was released alongside it. "Aboki" peaked at number 92 on Afribiz's Top 100 chart.

On 28 August 2012, Ice Prince released "More" as the second single from the album. The song was also produced by Chopstix. The music video for "More" was shot and directed in London by Moe Musa. It stars Lola Rae, a British Nigerian recording artist known for her single "Watch My Ting Go". The video premiered at the 2012 Channel O Music Video Awards.

On 25 January 2013, Ice Prince released "Aboki (Remix)"; he described the song as the "biggest African collision ever". The song features Sarkodie, Mercy Johnson, Wizkid, M.I and Khuli Chana. On 24 April 2013, Ice Prince and Chocolate City released "Gimme Dat" and "V.I.P" simultaneously. The former made the album's final track-listing, while the latter didn't.

2015–2016 :Jos To The World
In 2015, Ice Prince began making available singles from his third studio album. The eventual release of the album signified his first independent album outside Chocolate City record label. He revealed to Pulse he had Universal Studio in the US mix and master the album.

Super Cool Cats label
On 10 March 2015, Ice Prince founded Super Cool Cats, right after his contract with Chocolate City expired. On 23 May 2016, at a press conference held at Chocolate City office in Lagos, Ice Prince unveiled Chocolate City, as the parent company of his record label, and a sub-division of Chocolate City. On 28 August 2016, Ice Prince unveiled Jilex Anderson at The Quilox Ultra Pool Party (#QUPP), as SCC first act. On 12 December 2020, Ice Prince announced the signing of Au Pro, on Twitter, via a tweet.

Musical influences
Ice Prince cited Notorious B.I.G., Rakim, Jay-Z, Common, Talib Kweli, Kanye West, Ludacris, Busta Rhymes, Lauryn Hill, M.I and Jesse Jagz as his key musical influences.

Personal life
Ice Prince has a son named Jamal.

Discography

Studio albums
 Everybody Loves Ice Prince (2011)
 Fire of Zamani (2013)
 Jos to the World (2016)

EPs
 Trash Can (2015)
 C.O.L.D (2018)

Compilation albums
 The Indestructible Choc Boi Nation (2015)

Filmography

Film and television

Videography

Awards and nominations

References

External links
 
  Ice Prince on Doligo Music
 

Musicians from Minna
Living people
Nigerian songwriters
Nigerian male rappers
Nigerian hip hop singers
21st-century Nigerian musicians
The Headies winners
1986 births
People from Jos
21st-century male musicians